Walnut Ridge Regional Airport  is a city-owned public-use airport located four nautical miles (7 km) northeast of the central business district of Walnut Ridge, a city in Lawrence County, Arkansas, United States. According to the FAA's National Plan of Integrated Airport Systems for 2009–2013, its FAA airport category is general aviation.

It is located on land which used to house both Marine Corps Air Facility Walnut Ridge and Walnut Ridge Air Force Station.

In 1964, The Beatles briefly stopped at this airport on the way to and from a retreat in Missouri. This visit inspired a monument, a plaza, and a music festival in Walnut Ridge.

Facilities and aircraft
It has three runways: 4/22 is 6,001 by 150 feet (1,829 x 46 m) with an asphalt surface; 13/31 is 5,003 by 150 feet (1,525 x 46 m) with a concrete surface; 18/36 is 5,001 by 150 feet (1,524 x 46 m) with a concrete surface.

For the 12-month period ending July 31, 2008, the airport had 94,000 aircraft operations, an average of 257 per day: 97% general aviation, 2% military, and 1% air taxi. At that time there were 55 aircraft based at this airport: 62% single-engine, 9% multi-engine, 27% jet and 2% helicopter.

See also
 Arkansas World War II Army Airfields

References

External links
 Walnut Ridge Regional Airport
 

1942 establishments in Arkansas
Airports in Arkansas
Airports established in 1942
Transportation in Lawrence County, Arkansas
Buildings and structures in Lawrence County, Arkansas